Dakshin Dinajpur district is a district in the Indian state of West Bengal, India. It was created on 1 April 1992 by the division of the erstwhile West Dinajpur District. The Headquarter (sadar) of the district is at Balurghat. It comprises two subdivisions: Balurghat and Gangarampur. According to the 2011 census, it is the third least populous district of West Bengal (out of 23).

History 
The erstwhile Dinajpur District, at the time of the partition of India, was split up into West Dinajpur district and East Dinajpur. The East Dinajpur district, now called Dinajpur, became part of East Pakistan (now Bangladesh). The West Dinajpur district was enlarged in 1956, when States Reorganisation Act recommendations were implemented, with the addition of some areas of Bihar. The district was bifurcated into Uttar Dinajpur and Dakshin Dinajpur on 1 April 1992.

Economy 
Dakshin Dinajpur is predominantly an agricultural district with a large area of land under cultivation.  The district is drained by north-south flowing rivers like Atreyee, Purnabhaba, Tangon and Jamuna River, to give rise to a sizeable, unorganised fishing community.

Dakshin Dinajpur is a "non-large scale industry" but there are a number of medium and small hand loom industries especially Gangarampur block. Internet access is available from most of the cities, even broadband connections are available. There is one State Highway with only 77 km of National Highway No. 512 in the district. A new railway line has been laid between Eklakhi and Balurghat, the district headquarters. Train services were started on 30 December 2004.

In 2006 the Ministry of Panchayati Raj named Dakshin Dinajpur one of the country's 250 most backward districts (out of a total of 640). It is one of the eleven districts in West Bengal currently receiving funds from the Backward Regions Grant Fund Programme (BRGF).

Divisions

Administrative subdivisions 
The district comprises two subdivisions: Balurghat and Gangarampur at Buniadpur. Balurghat subdivision consists of Balurghat municipality and four community development blocks: Hili, Balurghat, Kumarganj and Tapan. Gangarampur subdivision consists of Gangarampur, Buniadpur municipalities and four community development blocks: Gangarampur, Bansihari, Harirampur and Kushmandi. Balurghat is the district headquarters. There are nine police stations, eight development blocks, Three municipalities, 64 gram panchayats and 2317 villages in this district.

Other than municipality area, each subdivision contains community development blocs which are divided into rural areas and census towns.

Balurghat subdivision
 Balurghat: municipality
 Hili (Community development block) consists of rural areas only with 5 gram panchayats.
 Balurghat (Community development block) consists of rural areas only with 11 gram panchayats.
 Kumarganj (Community development block) consists of rural areas only with 8 gram panchayats.
 Tapan (Community development block) consists of rural areas only with 11 gram panchayats.

Gangarampur subdivision at Buniadpur

 Buniadpur : Municipality
 Gangarampur : Municipality
 Gangarampur (Community development block) consists of rural areas only with 11 gram panchayats.
Bansihari (Community development block) consists of rural areas only with 4 gram panchayats.
 Harirampur (Community development block) consists of rural areas only with 6 gram panchayats.
 Kushmandi (Community development block) consists of rural areas only with 8 gram panchayats.

Assembly constituencies 
As per order of the Delimitation Commission in respect of the delimitation of constituencies in the West Bengal, the district was divided into six assembly constituencies:

Tapan constituency is reserved for ST candidates. Kushmandi and Gangarampur constituencies are reserved for SC candidates. Along with Itahar assembly constituency from Uttar Dinajpur district, the six assembly constituencies of this district form the Balurghat (Lok Sabha constituency).

Demographics 

According to the 2011 census Dakshin Dinajpur district has a population of 1,676,276. roughly equal to the nation of Guinea-Bissau. or the US state of Idaho. This gives it a ranking of 295th in India (out of a total of 640). Its population growth rate over the decade 2001–2011 was 11.16%. Dakshin Dinajpur has a sex ratio of 954 females for every 1000 males and a literacy rate of 73.86%. Scheduled Castes and Scheduled Tribes make up 28.80% and 16.43% of the population respectively.

Religion

Dakshin Dinajpur district has a majority Hindu population with over 73% people following Hinduism. Islam is the second-largest religion in the district with over 24% adherents. Christianity is followed by 1.48% of people. Muslims and Christians are almost entirely rural, and the urban population is nearly entirely Hindu. Muslims are a significant minority in Harirampur (49.00%) and Kushmandi (38.86%) CD blocks.

Languages 

Bengali is the principal language of the district. The Bengali dialect of the region is variously known as Varendri or Dinajpuri.

According to the 2011 census, 84.41% of the population spoke Bengali, 9.68% Santali, 1.31% Kurukh, 1.25% Sadri and 1.05% Hindi as their first language.

Education 
Dakshin Dinajpur University has started functioning from 2021. It is located at Mahinagar, Balurghat. There is a government nursing college at Balurghat. There is one JNV present.There is one D.A.V group school (Atreyee DAV Public School) and a Techno Group school at Balurghat.
There are a few good schools in Balurghat and Gangarampur. There are four CBSE affiliated and one CISCE affiliated school in Balurghat. Of late, The Green View English Academy is the only CISCE affiliated school in the entire district. The Atreyee D.A.V Public School  has earned several accolades, giving the entire district an honorable position in the academic map of the country. VVM Junior Level National Champion (2018–19), Saswata Bose, is a student of The ADAVPS. Many government schools exist throughout the district.

Tourist attractions 
 Bangarh
 Kaldighi Park (Gangarampur)
 Gour Dighi
 Dhal Dighi
 Bolla Kali Temple

 Khanpur (Tebhaga movement)

 Radha Gobindo Mandir (Tapan)
 Sarongbari 
 Mahipal Dighi

References

External links 

 

 
Districts of West Bengal
Minority Concentrated Districts in India
1992 establishments in West Bengal